Jim Titus is an American film and television actor.

Titus is the son of James T. Williams Sr. and Film & Television make-up artist Ellie Winslow. He has appeared in television shows, including FOX's The Mindy Project, NBC's Heroes, ABC's My Wife and Kids, Nickelodeon's Taina, and CBS' Without A Trace & Judging Amy. In 2003 Jim had a recurring role as "Officer Marvin Bryson" on the NBC hit Law & Order: Special Victims Unit. In 2010, he was cast as recurring Guest Star "Officer Barry Maple" on ABC Family's #1 hit Pretty Little Liars.

Titus has also appeared in films, including Gus Van Sant's critically acclaimed Finding Forrester starring Sean Connery, and several independent films, including the Sundance Film Festival Official Selections Rhythm of the Saints, and This Revolution.

In March 2017, Jim Titus Guest Starred on the CBS sitcom Superior Donuts

Jim Titus was announced as one of the stars of the film adaptation of the young adult novel, Eat Brains Love, on December 7, 2017.

References

External links

American male film actors
Male actors from New York City
1981 births
Living people